Martin de Mujica y Buitrón, (also known as Martin de Mogica or Muxica) was a Spanish Basque military man who was named by king Philip IV of Spain, to be Captain General and Royal Governor of Chile, besides president of its Real Audiencia.  His government was from May 1646 and April 1649, when he died, apparently poisoned.  Frequently described as an honest administrator.  He looked for peace with the mapuches, celebrating the Parliament of Quilín (1647).

References

1649 deaths
Basque people
Royal Governors of Chile
People from Goierri
Spanish generals
Spanish military personnel
17th-century Spanish people
Year of birth unknown